Deonise Fachinello (born 20 June 1983) is a former Brazilian handball player. She was a part of the Brazilian national team.

Achievements
Romanian National League:
Winner: 2015
Bronze Medalist: 2018
Romanian Cup:
Finalist: 2015
Spanish Division:
Winner: 2012
Runner-up: 2008
Queen's Cup
Winner: 2012
Spanish Supercup
Winner: 2012
Spanish Cup
Winner: 2007
French Championship:
Runner-up: 2010
French Cup:
Runner-up: 2010
EHF Cup Winners' Cup
 Winner: 2013
Austrian League:
Winner: 2009, 2013, 2014
Austrian Cup:
Winner: 2009, 2013, 2014
EHF Cup
 Runners-up: 2008
Pan American Games:
Winner: 2007, 2011
World Championship:
Winner: 2013
Pan American Championship:
Winner: 2007, 2011, 2013, 2015, 2017
Silver Medalist: 2009
South American Championship:
Winner: 2013

References

External links

1983 births
Living people
Brazilian female handball players
Handball players at the 2008 Summer Olympics
Handball players at the 2012 Summer Olympics
Handball players at the 2016 Summer Olympics
Olympic handball players of Brazil
Expatriate handball players
Brazilian expatriate sportspeople in Spain
Brazilian expatriate sportspeople in France
Brazilian expatriate sportspeople in Austria
Brazilian expatriate sportspeople in Denmark
Brazilian expatriate sportspeople in Romania
People from Santa Rosa, Rio Grande do Sul
Handball players at the 2007 Pan American Games
Handball players at the 2011 Pan American Games
Handball players at the 2015 Pan American Games
Handball players at the 2019 Pan American Games
Pan American Games medalists in handball
Pan American Games gold medalists for Brazil
South American Games gold medalists for Brazil
South American Games medalists in handball
Competitors at the 2018 South American Games
Medalists at the 2007 Pan American Games
Medalists at the 2019 Pan American Games
Medalists at the 2011 Pan American Games
Medalists at the 2015 Pan American Games
Sportspeople from Rio Grande do Sul